Skofnung was the sword of legendary Danish king Hrólf Kraki.  "The best of all swords that have been carried in northern lands", it was renowned for supernatural sharpness and hardness, as well as for being imbued with the spirits of the king's 12 faithful berserker bodyguards.

It appears in saga unrelated to Hrólf, it being said that an Icelander, Skeggi of Midfirth, who was chosen by lot to break into the gravemound and plunder it, recovered the sword while doing so, so it may have had some historical reality.  Other similar incidents are found in Norse literature, such as Grettir the Strong's recovery of a sword from a burial mound. Events concerning the recovery of Skofnung are related in chapter 9 and 10 of Kormáks saga.

It also appears in the Laxdœla saga, where it has come into the possession of Eid of Ás.  Eid is the son of Midfjardar-Skeggi, who had originally taken Skofnung from Hrólf Kraki's grave.  The sword is handed down from Eid to his kinsman Thorkel Eyjólfsson. Eid lends the sword to Thorkel to kill the outlaw Grim, who had killed Eid's son. Thorkel fought Grim, but the two became friends, and Thorkel never returned the sword to Eid.

Skofnung is briefly lost when Thorkel's ship is capsized while sailing around Iceland, and all of those on it drown.  The sword sticks fast in some of the timbers of the ship, and washes ashore. It is thus recovered at some point by Thorkel's son Gellir, as he is mentioned carrying it with him later in the saga.  Gellir dies in Denmark returning from pilgrimage to Rome, and is buried at Roskilde, and it seems Skofnung was buried with him (near where the sword was recovered from the burial mound in the first place) because the saga records that Gellir had the sword with him "and it was not recovered afterwards".

According to Eid of Ás in chapter 57 of the Laxdœla saga, the sword is not to be drawn in the presence of women, and that the sun must never shine on the sword's hilt.  This is in accordance with many other ancient superstitions, such as the Eggjum stone in Norway.  It is also told by Eid that any wound made by Skofnung will not heal unless rubbed with the Skofnung Stone, which Eid gives to Thorkel Eyjólfsson along with the sword.

References

Mythological swords
Mythological Norse weapons